Anytime Anywhere or variations thereupon may refer to:
Anytime...Anywhere, an album by Rita Coolidge
"Anytime Anywhere", a song by Gotthard from the album Lipservice
"Anytime Anywhere", a song by S Club Juniors from the album Together
"Anytime, Anywhere", a song by Miho Karasawa
"Anytime, Anywhere", a song by Sarah Brightman from the album Eden
"Anytime, Anywhere", an episode of the television series Stingray
Anytime Anywhere! Sho Kosugi's Towel Exercise, a television show starring Sho Kosugi
Quisquam Usquam, Latin phrase meaning "Anytime Anywhere", used as the motto of the United States 174th Air Defense Artillery Brigade